Ephrin type-A receptor 6 is a protein that in humans is encoded by the EPHA6 gene. 

EphA6 may serve an important role in breast carcinogenesis and may pose as a novel prognostic indicator and therapeutic target for breast cancer, particularly in patients with steroid receptor negative expression and HER‑2 overexpression

References

Further reading

External links 
 

Tyrosine kinase receptors